Sergey Leonidovich Dolgopolov (born 1941) is a Latvian Russian politician. He is a member of Harmony, former deputy mayor of Riga (2001–2005) and a deputy of the 9th, 10th, 11th, 12th and 13th Saeima (2006-present). In 2015 he was the Harmony's candidate in the election for President of Latvia.

References

External links

Saeima website

1941 births
Living people
Politicians from Riga
Latvian people of Russian descent
National Harmony Party politicians
New Centre (Latvia) politicians
Social Democratic Party "Harmony" politicians
Deputies of the 9th Saeima
Deputies of the 10th Saeima
Deputies of the 11th Saeima
Deputies of the 12th Saeima
Deputies of the 13th Saeima
Candidates for President of Latvia
Riga Technical University alumni